Patrick Michael Gilbert "George" Curran (17 March 1883 – 3 February 1957, also known as Gil Curran) was an  Australian rules footballer who played with South Melbourne in the Victorian Football League (VFL).

Notes

External links 

1883 births
1957 deaths
Australian rules footballers from Victoria (Australia)
Sydney Swans players
Horsham Football Club players